Tenthredo crassa is a sawfly species belonging to the family Tenthredinidae (common sawflies).

Distribution and habitat
This species can be found in most of Europe.

Description
These large sawflies have a black head, thorax and abdomen, with black femurs, yellowish tibiae and tarsi. Antennae are black, with white three final segments. The mandibles are whitish at the base. The wings are dark yellow along the outer edge, blackened at the apical third.

Biology
Adults can be found from May to August, feeding on inflorescence of Apiaceae. Larves are monophagic feeding on  Angelica species.

References

External links
 Bembix
  Macroclub
 Natura Mediterraneo

Tenthredinidae
Hymenoptera of Europe
Insects described in 1763
Taxa named by Giovanni Antonio Scopoli